Lateral pterygoid may refer to:

 Lateral pterygoid muscle
 Lateral pterygoid nerve
 Lateral pterygoid plate